Mangesh Narayanrao Kale is an Indian poet, artist, and editor.

Career
As a journalist, Kale started his career with the Marathi daily paper Marathwada. Later he started own daily, Khandesh. He is the editor of Khel, a Marathi literary magazine that has been involved with the Marathi literary movement for over a decade. His published works include Mangesh Narayanrao Kalechi Kavita (2001), Shaktipatache Sutra (2004), Naal Tutalya Pratham Purushache Drishtaant (2007) and Thus, It's Just Shape Of Poem (2007, translated from the original Marathi).

Bibliography

Mangesh Narayanrao Kalechi Kavita (Marathi), 2001
Shaktipaatache Sutra (Marathi) 2004
Naal Tutelya Pratham Purushache Drishtaant (Marathi), 2007-Abhidhanantar 
It's Just Shape of Poem (English translation of his Marathi poetry) 2007
Tritiya Purushache Aagman (Marathi) 2010-Abhidhanantar

Awards
In 2006, Kale was a recipient of the Yashwantrao Chavan Kharad Puraskar, a Marathi literature award, for Shaktipatache Sutra. He won the Maharashtra Foundation Award for his poetry collection Trutiya Purushache Aagman in 2011.

References

External links 
 

Indian male poets
Marathi-language poets
Living people
People from Aurangabad district, Maharashtra
Poets from Maharashtra
Year of birth missing (living people)